This is a list of cities in Panama.

Largest cities

These are the largest 20 Panamanian cities and towns, listed in descending order. All figures are estimates for the year 2016. The last census took place in 2010. Provincial capitals are shown in bold.

Alphabetical list

Achutupo
Ailigandí
Alanje
Alcalde Díaz
Almirante
Alto de la Estancia
Alto del Espino
Agua Buena
Aguadulce, Coclé
Ancón
Antón
Arraiján
Aserrío de Gariché
Atalaya
Berbá
Bisira
Boca de Parita
Bocas Town
Boquerón
Boquete
Bugaba
Burica
Bágala
Caimitillo
Calobre
Calzada Larga
Canoa
Capellanía
Capetí
Capira
Cartí Sugtupu
Cativá
Cañazas
Celmira
Cermeño
Cerro Cama
Cerro Punta
Chame
Changuinola
Chepo
Chichica
Chigoré
Chiguirí Arriba
Chilibre
Chimán
Chiriquí Grande
Chitré
Churuquita Chiquita
Churuquita Grande
Cirilo Guainora
Coetupo
Colón
Coloncito
Cristóbal
David
Divalá
Dolega
El Caño
El Copé
El Cortezo
El Cortezo
El Cristo
El Cristo
El Espavé
El Espino de Santa Rosa
El Giral
El Porvenir
El Real de Santa María
El Rincón
El Roble
El Silencio
El Uvito
El Valle de la Unión
Entradero
Escobal
Finca Blanco
Finca Cincuenta y Uno
Finca Corredor
Garachiné
Gariché
Guabito
Gualaca
Guararé
Guarumal
Guarumal
Horconcitos
Icantí
Ipetí
Jaqué
Kanir-Dup
Kankintú
Kusapin
La Cabima
La Chorrera
La Concepcion
La Espigadilla
La Loma
La Mata
La Mitra
La Palma
La Raya de Santa María
La Tiza
Las Cumbres
Las Guías Oriente
Las Minas
Las Tablas
Llano Largo
Llano Marín
Llano de Piedra
Los Algarrobos
Los Anastacios
Los Boquerones
Los Lotes
Los Pollos
Los Pozos
Lídice
Macaracas
Mamitipo
María Chiquita
Mata del Nance
Metetí
Monte Lirio
Mortí
Mulatupo
Nata
Nombre de Dios
Nueva Gorgona
Nuevo Arraiján
Nuevo Emperador
Nuevo Guararé
Nuevo San Juan
Nuevo Vigía
Ocú
Olá
Pacora
Pacola
Palmas Bellas
Panama City – capital
Parita
Paso Blanco
Pedasí
Pedregal
Pedregal
Pedregal
Penonomé
Pesé
Plaza de Caisán
Pocrí (Coclé)
Pocrí (Los Santos)
Portobello
Potrerillos Abajo
Potrerillos Arriba
Potrero Grande
Puerto Armuelles
Puerto Caimito
Puerto Indio
Puerto Pilón
Punta Peña
Quebrada Bonita Adentro
Río Alejandro
Río Duque
Río Hato
Río Rita
Río Sereno
Río de Jesús
Sabanitas
Sajalices
San Miguelito
San Vicente de Bique
Santa Ana Arriba
Santa Fé
Santa Rita Arriba
Santiago de Veraguas
Sasardi
Sioguí Abajo
Sioguí Arriba
Sortová
Tocumen
Tolé
Tonosí
Tubualá
Unión Chocó
Ustupo
Vacamonte
Valle del Risco
Villa Carmen
Villa Rosario
Volcán
Yaviza

See also

 Lists of cities in Central America

References
This article incorporates information from the French Wikipedia

External links

 
Panama, List of cities in
Panama
Cities in Panama